Supercar or variant may refer to:

 Supercar, a sports car, whose performance is highly superior to its contemporaries
 "Supercar" (band), Japanese rock band
 Supercar (TV series), a children's TV show produced by Gerry Anderson, and subsequently adapted as a comic strip
 Knight Rider (1982 TV series) was marketed as Supercar in Italy
 Supercars Championship, an Australian touring car racing category
 Le Supercar, an electric car model from LeEco
 Super Cars (1990 videogame) aka "Super Cars I", a Gremlin Interactive video game
 Super Cars II (1991 videogame), a Gremlin Interactive video game

See also
 Super (disambiguation)
 Car (disambiguation)
 Hypercar (disambiguation)
 Muscle car